Kim Jong-kook, born 1976, is a South Korean singer.

Kim Jong-kook or Kim Jong-gook may also refer to:

  (born 1963), South Korean comedian
 Kim Jong-kook (baseball) (born 1973), South Korean baseball player
 Kim Jong-kook (footballer) (born 1989), South Korean football player